Sir Harold Jeffreys, FRS (22 April 1891 – 18 March 1989) was a British mathematician, statistician, geophysicist, and astronomer. His book, Theory of Probability, which was first published in 1939, played an important role in the revival of the objective Bayesian view of probability.

Education
Jeffreys was born in Fatfield, County Durham, England, the son of Robert Hal Jeffreys, headmaster of Fatfield Church School, and his wife, Elizabeth Mary Sharpe, a school teacher. He was educated at his father's school and at Rutherford Technical College, then studied at Armstrong College in Newcastle upon Tyne (at that time part of the University of Durham) and with the University of London External Programme. 

Jeffreys subsequently won a scholarship to study the Mathematical Tripos at St John's College, Cambridge, where he established a reputation as an excellent student: obtaining first-class marks for his papers in Part One of the Tripos, he was a Wrangler in Part Two, and in 1915 he was awarded the prestigious Smith's Prize.

Career

Jeffreys became a fellow of St John's College in 1914, retaining his fellowship until his death 75 years later. At the University of Cambridge he taught mathematics, then geophysics and finally became the Plumian Professor of Astronomy.

In 1940, he married fellow mathematician and physicist, Bertha Swirles (1903–1999), and together they wrote Methods of Mathematical Physics.

One of his major contributions was on the Bayesian approach to probability (also see Jeffreys prior), as well as the idea that the Earth's planetary core was liquid.

By 1924 Jeffreys had developed a general method of approximating solutions to linear, second-order differential equations, including the Schrödinger equation. Although the Schrödinger equation was developed two years later, Wentzel, Kramers, and Brillouin were apparently unaware of this earlier work, so Jeffreys is often neglected when credit is given for the WKB approximation.

Jeffreys received the Gold Medal of the Royal Astronomical Society in 1937, the Royal Society's Copley Medal in 1960, and the Royal Statistical Society's Guy Medal in Gold in 1962. In 1948, he received the Charles Lagrange Prize from the Académie royale des Sciences, des Lettres et des Beaux-Arts de Belgique. He was knighted in 1953.

From 1939 to 1952 he was established as Director of the International Seismological Summary further known as International Seismological Centre.

The textbook Probability Theory: The Logic of Science, written by the physicist and probability theorist Edwin T. Jaynes, is dedicated to Jeffreys. The dedication reads, "Dedicated to the memory of Sir Harold Jeffreys, who saw the truth and preserved it."

It is only through an appendix to the third edition of Jeffreys' book Scientific Inference that we know about Mary Cartwright's method of proving that the number  is irrational.

Opposition to continental drift and plate tectonics
Like most of his contemporaries, Jeffreys was a strong opponent of continental drift as proposed by Alfred Wegener, Arthur Holmes, and even into the 1960s his Cambridge contemporaries. For him, continental drift was "out of the question" because no force even remotely strong enough to move the continents across the Earth's surface was evident. As geological and geophysical evidence for continental drift and plate tectonics mounted in the 1960s and after, to the point where it became the unifying concept of modern geology, Jeffreys remained a stubborn opponent of the theory to his death.

Honours and awards
 Fellow, Royal Society, 1925
 Adams Prize, 1927 (Constitution of the Earth)
 Gold Medal, Royal Astronomical Society, 1937
 Buchan Prize, Royal Meteorological Society, 1929
 Murchison Medal of Geological Society (Great Britain) 1939
 Victoria Medal, Royal Geographical Society, 1941
 Charles Lagrange Prize, Brussels Academy, 1948
 Royal Medal, 1948
 William Bowie Medal, American Geophysical Union, 1952
 Knighted, 1953
 Copley Medal, Royal Society, 1961
 Vetlesen Prize, 1962

Bibliography
 1924: The Earth, Its Origin, History and Physical Constitution, Cambridge University Press; 5th edn. 1970; 6th edn. 1976
 1927: Operational Methods in Mathematical Physics, Cambridge University Press via Internet Archive, Review:
 1929: The Future of the Earth, Norton & Company 
 1931: Scientific Inference, Macmillan Publishers; 2nd edn. 1937; 3rd edn. 1973
 1931: Cartesian Tensors. Cambridge University Press; 2nd edn. 1961
 1934: Ocean Waves and Kindred Geophysical Phenomena, with Vaughan Cornish, Cambridge University Press
 1935: Earthquakes and Mountains, Methuen Publishing; 2nd edn. 1950
 1939: Theory of Probability, Clarendon Press, Oxford; 2nd edn. 1948; 3rd edn. 1961
 1946: Methods of Mathematical Physics, with Bertha S. Jeffreys. Cambridge University Press; 2nd edn. 1950; 3rd edn. 1956; corrected 3rd edn. 1966
 1962: Asymptotic Approximations, Clarendon Press, Oxford
 1963: Nutation and Forced Motion of the Earth's Pole from the Data of Latitude Observations, Macmillan
 1971–77: Collected Papers of Sir Harold Jeffreys on Geophysics and Other Sciences, Gordon and Breach

References

Further reading
  (A review of Jeffreys' approach to probability; includes remarks on R.A. Fisher, Frank P. Ramsey, and Bruno de Finetti.

External links
 
 Photographs of Harold Jeffreys at Emilio Segrè Visual Archives, American Institute of Physics.
 Biography of Vetlesen Prize Winner – Sir Harold Jeffreys
 Harold Jeffreys as a Statistician

1891 births
1989 deaths
Alumni of St John's College, Cambridge
Alumni of University of London Worldwide
Alumni of the University of London
Bayesian statisticians
20th-century British astronomers
20th-century English mathematicians
English statisticians
Fellows of St John's College, Cambridge
Fellows of the Royal Society
Foreign associates of the National Academy of Sciences
Knights Bachelor
People from Fatfield
Recipients of the Copley Medal
Recipients of the Gold Medal of the Royal Astronomical Society
Royal Medal winners
British seismologists
Wollaston Medal winners
Analysands of Ernest Jones
Presidents of the Royal Astronomical Society
Victoria Medal recipients
Alumni of Armstrong College, Durham
Plumian Professors of Astronomy and Experimental Philosophy
Mathematical statisticians